Xu Linbei (born November 19, 1983 in Wafangdian, Dalian, Liaoning) is a Chinese sprint canoer who has competed since the early 2000s. She won a silver medal in the K-4 1000 m event at the 2002 ICF Canoe Sprint World Championships in Seville, Spain.

Xu also competed in two Summer Olympics, earning her best finish of fourth in the K-2 500 m event at Athens in 2004.

References

Sports-reference.com profile
Team China 2008 profile

1983 births
Living people
Canoeists at the 2004 Summer Olympics
Canoeists at the 2008 Summer Olympics
Canoeists from Liaoning
Olympic canoeists of China
Sportspeople from Dalian
Asian Games medalists in canoeing
ICF Canoe Sprint World Championships medalists in kayak
Canoeists at the 2002 Asian Games
Chinese female canoeists
Medalists at the 2002 Asian Games
Asian Games gold medalists for China